Kalla Thuppakki is a 2013 Indian Tamil-language thriller film directed by Logiyas and starring newcomers Vikky, Vijith, Prabhakaran, Tamilselvan, Kutty Anand and Savandhika.

Plot

Cast 
Vikky
Vijith
 Prabhakaran
Tamilselvan
Kutty Anand
Sravanthika
Sampath Ram

Soundtrack 
Music composed by SK Balachandran. Lyrics by DS. Gauthaman and Ilaya Kamban. A critic from IANS wrote that the music is "neither melodious, nor peppy". A critic from Behindwoods gave the music a rating of 0.5 out of 5 and stated that "On the whole, Kalla Thuppakki’s music is way off the mark".

"Uthi Uthi" – SK. Balachandran, Ravidevan
"Salam Namaste (Chennai)" – Ananth Menon, SK. Balachandran
"Kinathu Mettile" – Thanjai P. Rajasekaran, Sripriya
"Thaba Thaba" – Jaiswapnah, SK. Balachandran
"Midnight Kalloori" – MM. Manasi, CH. Raju, SK. Balachandran

Controversy 
The film was in the news for its similar title with Thuppakki (2012). The makers of this film filed a case against the makers of that film for using a similar title.

Release and reception 
The film was initially scheduled to release on Deepavali of 2012 but was postponed to 2013. A critic from The Times of India rated the film 0.5 out of 5 and said that "In the end, ‘Kallathuppakki’ misfires. The sloppy editing and uneven pacing only makes things worse". A critic from Behindwoods rated the film 0 out of 5 and opined that "To sum it all, Kalla Thuppaakki is unbelievably inane and is a tiring watch and makes you wonder what the director was smoking to come up with such claptrap".

References

External links 
 

2010s Tamil-language films
2013 thriller films
Indian thriller films